Mayberry Township is one of twelve townships in Hamilton County, Illinois, USA.  As of the 2010 census, its population was 486 and it contained 248 housing units.

Geography

Cities, towns, villages
 Broughton

Unincorporated towns
 Nipper Corner at 
(This list is based on USGS data and may include former settlements.)

Extinct towns
 Rectorville at 
(These towns are listed as "historical" by the USGS.)

Cemeteries
The township contains these ten cemeteries: Albion, Big Hill, Clark, Cook, Gholson, Keasler, Lantham, Morris, New Prospect and Wolfe.

Demographics

School districts
 Eldorado Community Unit School District 4
 Hamilton County Community Unit School District 10
 Norris City-Omaha-Enfield Community Unit School District 3

Political districts
 Illinois's 15th congressional district
 State House District 118
 State Senate District 59

References
 
 United States Census Bureau 2009 TIGER/Line Shapefiles
 United States National Atlas

External links
 City-Data.com
 Hamilton County Historical Society
 Illinois State Archives
 Mayberry Township History
 Township Officials of Illinois

Townships in Hamilton County, Illinois
Mount Vernon, Illinois micropolitan area
Townships in Illinois
1885 establishments in Illinois